Moroccanization was a Moroccan domestic economic policy enacted by King Hassan II on March 3, 1973, in which major segments of the private sector were transferred to Moroccan ownership.

The policy had the effect of "transferring to political loyalists and high-ranking military officers state-held assets, agricultural lands, and enterprises that were more than 50 percent foreign owned." Overnight, the portion of industrial enterprises in Morocco that were owned by Moroccans increased from 18% to 55%.

In the following period, from 1973 to 1977, the Moroccan economy grew at a rate of 7.3% annually, financed mainly with foreign loans.

References 

History of Morocco
Economic history of Morocco
Economic policy in Africa